My Kingdom For... is a 1985 American documentary directed by Budd Boetticher, where he talks about his interest for bullfighting.

References

External links

1985 films
American documentary films
1985 documentary films
Films directed by Budd Boetticher
1980s American films